Frederick John Vanderbyl Hopley  (27 August 1883 – 16 August 1951) was a South African sportsman who was an amateur boxer, first-class cricketer and international rugby union player for England.

Early life
Hopley was born in South Africa, the elder son of Judge William Musgrave Hopley and his wife Annie (née van der Byl). He completed his schooling in England, at Harrow School, before going up to Pembroke College, Cambridge.

Boxing
Hopley was the British public schools' Heavyweight Boxing Champion in 1901 and 1902. He boxed for Cambridge University and was regarded as one of the best heavyweight boxers in the British Empire. Most of his fights were won by knock out and tragically, in a 1912 bout, he threw a punch which resulted in a prolonged coma for his opponent, Cloyce Seagram. Although the blow was not fatal Hopley never fought again competitively.

Rugby
A flanker, Hopley played three Tests for England. The first was in a win over France in 1907, a warm up match for that year's Home Nations Championship, in which he would feature once, against Wales in Swansea. His other Test came against Ireland in the 1908 Home Nations Championship. He played his club rugby for Blackheath and also had the distinction of representing the Barbarians.

Cricket
Hopley was a fast bowler and capable lower order batsman. He took 45 wickets for Cambridge University and also played three first-class matches for the H. D. G. Leveson Gower's XI and another two with the Marylebone Cricket Club. His fourth and final first-class team was South Africa's Western Province, which he played one match for in 1909. He put in the best performance of his career in Cambridge's win over London County in 1904. He took 6/37 off just 9.3 overs in the first innings, which included the wicket of W. G. Grace. In the second innings he took another four wickets to finish with match figures of 10/132.

First World War
Hopley served with the Grenadier Guards Special Reserve, which was attached to the 3rd Battalion. He survived the war and received a DSO "for conspicuous gallantry in action" at Beaumont-Hamel in 1916. His younger brother, Geoffrey Hopley, also a Cambridge cricketer, wouldn't be as fortunate and was killed in France.

Later life
Hopley had returned to southern Africa in 1908, establishing a farm at Marandellas near Salisbury in Rhodesia in 1910.  He married Joyce Pitout in 1915.  They had two daughters.

The John Hopley Memorial Trophy is awarded each year to the Zimbabwean Sportsman of the Year from 1956.

References

1883 births
People educated at Harrow School
Alumni of Pembroke College, Cambridge
South African rugby union players
England international rugby union players
South African cricketers
Barbarian F.C. players
Blackheath F.C. players
Cambridge University cricketers
Marylebone Cricket Club cricketers
Western Province cricketers
British Army personnel of World War I
Companions of the Distinguished Service Order
1951 deaths
South African male boxers
People from Makhanda, Eastern Cape
H. D. G. Leveson Gower's XI cricketers
Expatriates from Cape Colony in the United Kingdom